The Gonâve worm lizard (Amphisbaena gonavensis) is a worm lizard species in the family Amphisbaenidae. It is endemic to Gonâve Island.

References

Amphisbaena (lizard)
Reptiles described in 1962
Taxa named by Carl Gans
Taxa named by A. Allen Alexander
Endemic fauna of Haiti
Reptiles of Haiti